The Seneca Rail Bridge is a rail bridge in Seneca, Illinois over  the Illinois River.
It was built by the Chicago, Rock Island & Pacific. The first bridge in this location was built around 1853; the present bridge around  1930.

References

Bridges completed in 1930
Bridges in LaSalle County, Illinois
Bridges over the Illinois River
Railroad bridges in Illinois
Steel bridges in the United States